is a Japanese football player. He plays for Giravanz Kitakyushu.

Career
Toshiki Onozawa joined Cerezo Osaka in 2016. On March 13, he debuted in J3 League (v Grulla Morioka).

Club statistics
Updated to 22 February 2020.

References

External links

Profile at Cerezo Osaka
Profile at J. League

1998 births
Living people
Association football people from Nagasaki Prefecture
Japanese footballers
J1 League players
J2 League players
J3 League players
Cerezo Osaka players
Cerezo Osaka U-23 players
Giravanz Kitakyushu players
Association football midfielders